Griffin & Phoenix is a 2006 American romance film directed by Ed Stone and written by John Hill. It stars Dermot Mulroney and Amanda Peet and is a remake of the 1976 film Griffin and Phoenix.

Plot
The film starts with Henry Griffin (Dermot Mulroney) learning from his oncologist that his cancer has spread and that he only has one year, two at most, left to live. This discovery starts him on a journey of self-reflection which includes starting a novel and taking a psychology class at New York University. In this class, he meets Sarah Phoenix (Amanda Peet). He asks her on a date and after hesitation she comes. Then the two of them goof around and eventually stay up all night together watching the sunrise. Griffin believes they are close, but Phoenix doesn't show as much interest. Although Phoenix sends Griffin the occasional mixed signals, the two team up for a whirlwind of adventurous and almost childlike activities, such as painting graffiti on a water tower. However Phoenix doesn't want to hurt Griffin or herself by falling in love because she's too weak to deal with it as she too has cancer and is also short of time. One day while at Griffin's house after their adventure, while cleaning she comes across his books on dying and "living life to the fullest" and comes to the conclusion that Griffin knows she's ill and is being nice only out of sympathy. She storms out and after their confrontation Griffin explains that the books belong to him and he too has cancer. This causes the two to fall ever more deeply for one another, and their relationship deepens. Together, they strive to make the most of their last days of life. However while exploring and making the most of their last days, Griffin explains how when he gets seriously ill he will just leave and he wishes for her to not come looking for him because it's something he feels he must do himself. But Phoenix is first to get sick and uses Griffin's same words against him. This deeply hurts Griffin and causes him to overreact. Later, however, after realizing he was wrong, he decides he wants to spend the last moments of Phoenix's life with her anyhow. Griffin makes a last 'Christmas' for Phoenix, as it is her favorite season and it would be their last holiday together. The movie ends with two men repainting the water tower, covering Griffin's graffiti heart proclaiming his love for Phoenix.

Cast

 Amanda Peet as Phoenix
 Dermot Mulroney as Griffin
 Sarah Paulson as Peri
 Blair Brown as Eve
 Alison Elliott as Terry
 Lois Smith as Dr. Imberman
 Jonah Meyerson as Kirk
 Max Morris as Andrew
 Simon Jones as Professor
 Jesse Tyler Ferguson as Student (as Jesse Ferguson)
 Susan Pourfar as Waitress
 Omar Scroggins as Movie Usher
 Adam Kulbersh as Stu Knoepflemacher
 Adriane Lenox as Doctor
 Novella Nelson as Maya Restaurant Owner
 Don McManus as Good Samaritan #1
 Jason Workman as Good Samaritan #2
 Brian Klugman as Beach Stud
 Sile Bermingham as Lilly
 Steven Randazzo as Cop #1
 Ted Koch as Cop #2
 Dana Eskelson as Mother with Stroller
 T.J. Stanton as Crying Boy
 Michael Showalter as Terry's Fiancé
 Fred Armisen (uncredited)
 John Farrer  as Hospital Doctor (uncredited)
 Chuck Gerena as Water Tower Painter (uncredited)
 Pablo Hernandez as Luc (uncredited)
 Robert Oppel as Tattooed Student (uncredited)
 Kristen Silverman as Bikini Babe (uncredited)

References

External links
 
 Griffin & Phoenix at Gold Circle's website
 Griffin & Phoenix at Lifetime's website
 

2006 films
2006 romantic drama films
Remakes of American films
American romantic drama films
Films shot in New York (state)
Films produced by Jason Blum
Blumhouse Productions films
Gold Circle Films films
Sidney Kimmel Entertainment films
Films about cancer
Films set in New York City
Films scored by Roger Neill
Metro-Goldwyn-Mayer films
2000s English-language films
2000s American films